General elections were held in Antigua and Barbuda on 12 June 2014. The result was a victory for the opposition Antigua and Barbuda Labour Party led by Gaston Browne, which won 14 of the 17 seats. Following the election, Browne became the country's youngest Prime Minister.

Background
After a long delay due to a pending Court order about a boundary change which would have affected the parliamentary seats, on 15 May 2014 the Prime Minister Baldwin Spencer set the election day.

Electoral system
The 17 elected members of the House of Representatives were elected in single-member constituencies by first-past-the-post. There were 164 polling stations.

Campaign
During the campaign Gaston Browne said that he would make the country an economic powerhouse in the Caribbean. He also campaigned on turning around a stagnant economy, high unemployment and crime. He further sought to bring about full employment and attract investment while saying "there will be no quick fixes" and it would take time to change.

Results
The Labour Party won 14 of 17 seats, while the ruling UPP won the other three seats. UPP Prime Minister Baldwin Spencer was re-elected in his seat by a narrow margin of about 30 votes. Arthur Nibbs of the Labour Party was elected in Barbuda by a single vote, which remains the last occasion that a national party won the Barbuda constituency.

By constituency

Reactions
Browne said of the result that "it is evident that the people have spoken and they have spoken resoundly. [sic] [I am] very humbled by the mandate. The reality is that this country is in dire straits and would require the efforts of the entire nation. [The win is] one for you the people. We have actually set an impressive vision for this country. I remain hopeful and very optimistic about the future of the Antigua and Barbuda. I want us to work towards the vision and to make Antigua and Barbuda the envy of the other countries in the world. [The victory] itself actually speaks volumes. I would not think we could have deserved a better out turn." Spencer accepted defeat, saying that the people had clearly chosen the ALP.

International
 Team Unity leader Timothy Harris congratulated Browne and said he would support the new government. He added: "I extend my very best wishes to you and your incoming administration as you assume the mandate of service to the people of Antigua and Barbuda and the region. From our many interactions over the years, I know that you are passionate and committed to build a better Antigua and Barbuda and Caribbean region. In that noble mission of service to the people you have our every encouragement and support."

Government formation
Attorney Steadroy "Cuttie" Benjamin became the attorney general.

References

Elections in Antigua and Barbuda
Antigua
General
Antigua